Lamlai is a town, governed by a Municipal Council, in the Imphal East district of Manipur state of India.

Demographics
 India census, Lamlai had a population of 4077. Males constitute 51% of the population and females 49%. Lamlai has an average literacy rate of 66%, higher than the national average of 59.5%: male literacy is 74%, and female literacy is 57%. In Lamlai, 13% of the population is under 6 years of age.

References

Cities and towns in Imphal East district
Imphal East district